SS Benjamin Rush was a Liberty ship built in the United States during World War II. She was named after Founding Father Benjamin Rush, a signatory to the United States Declaration of Independence and a civic leader in Philadelphia, where he was a physician, politician, social reformer, humanitarian, and educator as well as the founder of Dickinson College. Rush attended the Continental Congress. He served as Surgeon General of the Continental Army and became a professor of chemistry, medical theory, and clinical practice at the University of Pennsylvania.

Construction
Benjamin Rush was laid down on 13 December 1941, under a Maritime Commission (MARCOM) contract, MCE hull 303, by the Bethlehem-Fairfield Shipyard, Baltimore, Maryland; she was sponsored by Mrs. Benjamin Rush Jr., the wife of the vice president of Industrial Insurance Company of America, and was launched on 25 June 1942.

History
She was allocated to United Fruit Co., on 11 July 1942. On 24 October 1947, she was laid up in the James River Reserve Fleet, Lee Hall, Virginia. A fire on 13 December 1948, burned out the midship house, causing an estimated $250,000—$265,000 in damages. She was recommended for scrapping on 21 December 1951, instead of repairing. On 29 April 1954, she was sold for scrapping to Boston Metals Co., along with four of her sister ships for $353,885. She was removed from the fleet on 9 May 1954.

References

Bibliography

 
 
 
 

 

Liberty ships
Ships built in Baltimore
1942 ships
James River Reserve Fleet
Ships named for Founding Fathers of the United States